KDG could refer to:

 Kardzhali Airport in Bulgaria (IATA airport code KDG)
 Kedgaon railway station in India (Indian Railways station code KDG) 
 Kidsgrove railway station in England (National Rail station code KDG)
 The Seba language of the Kunda people (ISO 639-3 language code KDG)
 :de:Komponisten der Gegenwart ("Contemporary Composers"), a German-language music encyclopedia
 The 1st King's Dragoon Guards, a former British army regiment
 Globe KDG Snipe, an American target drone